Ionel Chebac (born 30 September 1967) is a Romanian former footballer who played as a midfielder. His son, Alexandru Chebac was also a footballer.

Honours
Oțelul Galați
Divizia B: 1990–91
Rapid București
Cupa României runner-up: 1994–95

Notes

References

1967 births
Living people
Romanian footballers
Association football midfielders
Liga I players
Liga II players
ASC Oțelul Galați players
FC Rapid București players
FC Brașov (1936) players
FCM Dunărea Galați players
Sportspeople from Galați